Harpalus tichonis is a species of ground beetle in the subfamily Harpalinae. It was described by Jakobson in 1907.

References

tichonis
Beetles described in 1907